is a Japanese mystery manga series written by Ryōsuke Takeuchi and illustrated by Hikaru Miyoshi, based on Sir Arthur Conan Doyle's Sherlock Holmes series. It focuses on the youth of Holmes' nemesis, William James Moriarty. An anime television series adaptation by Production I.G aired from October 2020 to June 2021.

Plot
In the late 19th century, the British Empire has become a global power. Due to the strict class stratification, the average citizen has little chance of successfully rising up to the top, where the despicable nobility rules over them all. Albert Moriarty finds two orphans that share a common hatred for the corrupt British nobility and adopts them as his brothers. They scheme together to kill Albert's cruel biological brother, burn down the family estate, and then start a new life together aimed at using illegal means to destroy the class system which had plagued the country for centuries while Louis's brother takes on the name of William James Moriarty. While enacting an elaborate scheme to murder a noble who was hunting commoners, William encounters Sherlock, who deduces a third party was involved in the murder. This piques William's interest in Sherlock, leading him to test his abilities by framing Sherlock for murder.

Thus ensues a battle of wits between two of the greatest minds the world has ever seen as William relentlessly pursues a better world and Sherlock pursues the reason why he was chosen by the infamous Lord of Crime to play a part in his murders.

Characters

The middle Moriarty brother and a crime consultant. He possesses great intelligence and uses it to come up with perfect crimes in hopes of ending the class system and reforming society. He helps victims of class-influenced crimes get their revenge by setting up a crime scene where their victims do the killing without leaving any evidence of their involvement behind. William was originally raised in an orphanage before being adopted by Albert and assumed the identity of the real William after murdering him.

The oldest of the Moriarty brothers. He is the only member of the original Moriarty family of the brothers as he adopted William and Louis after witnessing how broken his real family is and came to believe in William's dreams of remaking society. He is a lieutenant colonel in the British army who retires to head MI6 under Mycroft Holmes's watchful eye.

 
The youngest of the Moriarty brothers and William's younger biological brother. As a child, he suffered from an unknown illness until Albert's father was manipulated into getting him life-saving surgery. He is devoted to William, and eventually takes over the leadership role of both his brothers'.

William's friend and rival. He works as a consulting detective who helps Scotland Yard and other clients with cases they can't solve. William takes an interest in him after realizing Sherlock's brilliance during their first meeting and proceeds to "cast" him in the role of a hero in his plan to remake society, but Sherlock has no interest in being manipulated or left behind by the one person he feels understands him.

Watson is a veteran who was a combat medic in the First Anglo-Afghan War as well as Sherlock's flatmate who helps him solve cases and chronicles them with heavy fictionalizations to suit his and Sherlock's purposes.

An associate of William's who is a master of disguise and martial arts, including the deadly use of knives and firearms. He acts as William's spy and information broker and very rarely speaks unless delivering the information he has gathered. Despite his withdrawn personality, at heart he is quite gentle and kind, especially around children and hates when children are the victims of crimes.

Sebastian began working for William after returning home from India as a veteran marked Killed in Action after the death of his entire squad and promoted up to his current rank as Colonel. He is an expert sniper, able to hit his targets at quite extreme distances, especially with rifles and acts as William's soldier, bodyguard, and assassin. He has sworn his life to William.

Sherlock's older brother and the director of the UK's War Office. He also serves as M's boss and Albert's close friend. He is very stoic but equally sentimental, though he hides this under layers of denial.
 / 

They befriended Sherlock Holmes briefly and then began working alongside the Moriartys after being forced to fake their death. While working for Moriarty, they operate under the name "James Bond" and has wholeheartedly embraced their identity as a man.

A old veteran, he worked as the Rockwell's butler while the Moriarty brothers were young after they were taken in by the Rockwells following the murder of the rest of the Moriarty family. He taught them how to fight, kill, and cook, and is rehired by them as adults.

An expert mechanic from Germany despite his blindness, Herder serves as William's inventor and in MI6 as "Q," designing weapons and gadgets well ahead of their time. He is an excitable man who is easily frustrated and reacts strongly to teasing.

He is the chief of police in Scotland Yard, serving as a mole for Moriarty and keep the police as corruption free as he can.

A corrupt journalist, self-styled as the "King of Blackmail," who enjoys forcing people in despair and leading them to their own sin and ruin.

A Pinkerton agent working for the US government. He rescues Sherlock and William following The Final Problem and brings them to New York City to recover and work alongside him.
Ms Moneypenny
She works as a secretary for MI6, while also being a close associate of the Moriartys. She is very attached to each of her colleagues, and shows her combat skills on multiple occasions.

Media

Manga
Moriarty the Patriot, written by Ryōsuke Takeuchi and illustrated by Hikaru Miyoshi, began serialization in Shueisha's shōnen manga magazine Jump Square on August 4, 2016. The series ended its first part on December 2, 2022. As of February 2023, it has been collected in nineteen tankōbon volumes. The manga is licensed in North America by Viz Media.

A manga adaptation of the spin-off novel series, written by Yōsuke Saita, titled Moriarty the Patriot: The Remains, started in Jump Square on March 3, 2023.

Volume list

Stage plays
Four stage musical adaptations have been staged and released on video, with a fifth scheduled for August, 2023. They loosely follow the plot of the original manga in sequence.

In addition, two stage plays without singing and unrelated to the musicals have also been staged.

Anime
An anime television series adaptation was announced at the Jump Festa '20 event on December 22, 2019. The series was directed by Kazuya Nomura at Production I.G, with Tooru Ookubo designing the characters and serving as chief animation director. Gō Zappa and Taku Kishimoto were in charge of scripts, and Asami Tachibana composed the music. This is the first time for Kazuya Nomura to be a director of an anime adaptation of a manga work.

While the first episode was pre-screened on September 21, 2020, the first half of the series officially aired from October 11 to December 20, 2020, on Tokyo MX, BS11, and MBS. The first opening theme, "DYING WISH", is performed by Tasuku Hatanaka, while first the ending theme, "ALPHA", is performed by STEREO DIVE FOUNDATION. The series ran for 24 episodes, with the second half of 13 episodes airing from April 4 to June 27, 2021. The second opening theme, "TWISTED HEARTS", is performed by Hatanaka, while the second ending theme, "OMEGA", is performed by STEREO DIVE FOUNDATION.

Muse Communication has licensed the anime in Southeast Asia and South Asia, which was streamed on its Muse Asia YouTube channel. Funimation also acquired the series to stream on its website in North America and the British Isles. On August 13, 2021, Funimation announced the series would receive an English dub, which premiered on August 15. Following Sony's acquisition of Crunchyroll, the series was moved to Crunchyroll.

A 2-episode OVA project has been announced. It was released on April 27, 2022.

See also
 All You Need Is Kill, a light novel, whose manga adaptation was written by Ryōsuke Takeuchi
 St&rs, a manga series written by Ryosuke Takeuchi
 Kanshikan Tsunemori Akane, a manga series written and illustrated by Hikaru Miyoshi

Notes

References

External links
Manga official website 
Anime official website 

2022 anime OVAs
Anime series based on manga
Comics set in London
Crime in anime and manga
Crunchyroll anime
IG Port franchises
Muse Communication
Mystery anime and manga
Production I.G
Sherlock Holmes television series
Shōnen manga
Shueisha manga
Television shows set in London
Tokyo MX original programming
Viz Media manga
Works based on Sherlock Holmes